Malmijan (also Romanized as Malmījān, Mālīyān, and Malmīān) is a village in Gudarzi Rural District, Oshtorinan District, Borujerd County, Lorestan Province, Iran. At the 2006 census, its population was 705, in 212 families.

References 

Towns and villages in Borujerd County